Ctenosaura melanosterna, commonly known as the black-chested spiny-tailed iguana or Honduran spinytailed iguana, is a species of lizard in the family Iguanidae.

Geographic range
It is endemic to Honduras, in both the mainland and two of the Cayos Cochinos islands off its Caribbean coast.

Habitat
Its natural habitat is subtropical or tropical dry forests.

Conservation status
Ctenosaura melanosterna is mainly endangered by human activities, as humans poach these iguanas and their eggs for consumption (Montgomery et al. 2014). The Green iguana is also much more numerous throughout Central America, making it a competitor for food and resources.

References

Further reading
 Buckley, L.J., and R.W. Axtell. 1997. Evidence for the Specific Status of the Honduran Lizards Formerly Referred to Ctenosaura palearis (Reptilia: Squamata: Iguanidae). Copeia 1997 (1): 138–150.
Montgomery, Chad E., S. A. Pasaschnik, L. E. Ruyle, J. A. Frazier, and S. E. W. Green. 2014. Natural History of the Black-Chested Spiny-Tailed Iguanas, Ctenosaura melanosterna (Igunaidae), on Cayo Cochino Menor, Honduras. The Southwestern Naturalist 59:280–285.

Reptiles of Honduras
Ctenosaura
Endemic fauna of Honduras
Reptiles described in 1997
Taxonomy articles created by Polbot
Lizards of the Caribbean